The Walsh Building in Saint Paul, Minnesota, United States, was designed by Edward Bassford in 1888.  The Romanesque Revival building has been used as a residence, school, and manufacturing facility. It is listed on the National Register of Historic Places.

References

External links
 NRHP Nomination Form

Commercial buildings completed in 1888
Commercial buildings on the National Register of Historic Places in Minnesota
National Register of Historic Places in Saint Paul, Minnesota
Romanesque Revival architecture in Minnesota